Luca Lombardi may refer to:

 Luca Lombardi (composer) (born 1945), Italian composer
 Luca Lombardi (footballer) (born 2002), Italian footballer